The Parliamentary Christian Fellowship, also known as the Parliamentary prayer group, is a gathering of Christian politicians in the Australian parliament, who hold prayer sessions on Monday nights in Parliament House, Canberra.

Overview
The Parliamentary Christian Fellowship is mainly attended by socially conservative Members of Parliament. Kevin Rudd is considered the mainstay of the group,
and is the only member of the Labor Party to regularly attend. Rudd has formed a good relationship with conservative independent Bob Katter as a result of their mutual attendance at the group.

"They're not confessional, as such," according to Bruce Baird, "but they are quite personal encounters that go to the implication of what it means to be a Christian with a heavy public burden."

Members who have attended include:
Kevin Rudd
Bronwyn Bishop
Bob Katter
Bob Baldwin
Sussan Ley
Christopher Pyne

The Fellowship hosts an annual National Prayer Breakfast and associated seminars modelled on the American National Prayer Breakfast organised by The Fellowship.

The current Chairwoman of the Fellowship is Louise Markus MP, Federal Member for Macquarie

See also
Catholic Church and politics
Christianity in Australia
Interior life (Catholic theology)
Religion in Australia
Secularism

References

External links
European Prayer Breakfast, hosted by Members of the European Parliament.
Similar UK initiative.
About prayer in the UK Parliament.
Theos, a UK thinktank for debate about the place of religion in society.

Christianity in Australia
Parliament of Australia
Religion in the British Empire